The Hughes Printing Company was an American printing company based out of East Stroudsburg, Pennsylvania. At one time, they employed George William Beatty, who worked there long enough he rose to superintendent.

Printing companies of the United States
Companies based in Monroe County, Pennsylvania
Defunct manufacturing companies based in Pennsylvania